St. Nicholas Byzantine Catholic Church, also known as St. Nicholas Greek Catholic Church, is a historic Catholic Church church at 504 S. Liberty Street in Perryopolis, Fayette County, Pennsylvania. It was built between 1912 and 1918, and is a 30 feet by 60 feet yellow brick building in the Byzantine Revival style.  It has a cruciform plan and the gabled roof is topped by four onion domes.  The church served a community of Rusyns who originally settled in the area prior to 1907.

It was added to the National Register of Historic Places in 1997.

References

1918 establishments in Pennsylvania
Churches on the National Register of Historic Places in Pennsylvania
Churches in Fayette County, Pennsylvania
Rusyn-American culture in Pennsylvania
National Register of Historic Places in Fayette County, Pennsylvania
Eastern Catholic churches in Pennsylvania